Sheri Elwood is a Canadian screenwriter/director working in film and television, best known as creator of the series Call Me Fitz starring Jason Priestley.

Filmography

Television

Film

Awards and nominations
Awards
 2000 Sudbury Cinéfest - Best Ontario Feature - Deeply
 1998 Gemini - Best Short Film - Eb & Flo

External links 
 

Canadian women screenwriters
Canadian television writers
Living people
Year of birth missing (living people)
Canadian Screen Award winners
Canadian television directors
Canadian women television directors
Film directors from Nova Scotia
Canadian women film directors
20th-century Canadian screenwriters
20th-century Canadian women writers
21st-century Canadian screenwriters
21st-century Canadian women writers
Canadian women television writers